Nothing But the Truth (Swedish: Rena rama sanningen) is a 1939 Swedish comedy film directed by Weyler Hildebrand and starring Erik Berglund, Tollie Zellman and Sickan Carlsson. It was shot at the Råsunda Studios in Stockholm. The film's sets were designed by the art director Arne Åkermark. It is based on the 1914 novel Nothing But the Truth by Frederic S. Isham and its 1916 Broadway adaptation.

Cast
 Erik Berglund as Banker Ludvig Lund 
 Tollie Zellman as Charlotta Lund
 Sickan Carlsson as 	Märta Lund
 Åke Söderblom as 	Åke Lund
 Håkan Westergren as 	Bertil Dahl
 Eric Abrahamsson as Filip Morell
 Marianne Löfgren as Gun Morell
 Hilding Gavle as 	Josephson
 Maritta Marke as 	Eva Berg
 Karin Nordgren as 	Astrid Holm
 Thor Modéen as 	Police Inspector
 Torsten Winge as 	Dr. Bruhn
 Richard Lund as 	Mr. Lagersten
 Douglas Håge as Wholesaler Ström
 Julia Cæsar as 	Kristin
 	Britta Larsson	as	Ellen, Lunds' Housemaid 
 Alice Wallis as 	Kerstin, Lunds' Housemaid 
 Bror Bügler as Actor 
 Svea Holst as Shop Assistant 
 Artur Cederborgh as 	Man at Police Station
 Artur Rolén as 	Man at Police Station 
 Ivar Wahlgren as 	Policeman 
 Anna-Stina Wåglund as 	Telephone Operator

References

Bibliography 
 Wright, Rochelle. The Visible Wall: Jews and Other Ethnic Outsiders in Swedish Film. SIU Press, 1998.

External links 
 

1939 films
Swedish comedy films
1939 comedy films
1930s Swedish-language films
Films directed by Weyler Hildebrand
Films based on American novels
1930s Swedish films